The Vediantii were a Celto-Ligurian tribe dwelling on the Mediterranean coast, near present-day Nice, during the Iron Age and the Roman period.

Name 
They are mentioned as Ou̓ediantíōn (Οὐεδιαντίων) by Ptolemy (2nd c. AD), and an oppidum Vediantiorum civitatis is documented by Pliny (1st c. AD).

The ethnonym Vediantii is probably Celtic. It has been interpreted as 'pertaining to the praying ones' (from the root wed- 'to pray' extended by a present participial formation -ie-nt-), as the 'Leaders' (from *wedʰ-yā 'guidance, leadership'), or else as the 'Sages' (from *weid-yā 'knowledge, doctrine').

Geography 
The Vediantii dwelled on the Mediterranean coast, between the river Var and the Mont Agel, around the Massaliote colony of Nikaea (modern Nice). Their territory was located east of the Deciates and Nerusii, west of the Intimilii, and south of the Vesubiani.

Their chief town was the oppidum Vediantiorum, known as Cemenelum by the 2nd century AD. Corresponding to modern Cimiez, now a neighbourhood of Nice, the settlement controlled the trading route from the Mediterranean coast towards the hinterland and the Alps. After the subjugation of the Ligurian tribes in 14 BC, Cemenelum became the centre of the local Roman military government, then served as the capital of the new Roman province from its creation by Nero in 63 AD.

History 
Contrary to other tribes of the region, the Vediantii were probably allied or tributary to Massalia and the Roman Republic by the 2nd century BC. When the Oxybii and Deciates attacked the Massaliote colonies of Nikaea and Antipolis (Antibes) and were subsequently defeated in 154 BC, the territory of the Vediantii was not reduced by the Romans, and their chief town Cemenelum became the capital of the Alpes Maritimae after its foundation in 63 AD. Additionally, the Vediantii are not mentioned in the Trophy of the Alps, suggesting that they were either already subjugated by or allied to Rome at the time of the conquest of the region in 14 BC.

Religion 
Three inscriptions dated to the 1st–2nd centuries AD and dedicated to the Matres Vediantiae were found near Tourrette-Levens and Cimiez.

References

Primary sources

Bibliography 

Historical Celtic peoples
Gauls
Tribes of pre-Roman Gaul
Ligures